Stura  was a department of the French Consulate and of the First French Empire in present-day Italy. It was named after the river Stura di Demonte. It was formed in 1801, when the Subalpine Republic (formerly the mainland portion of the Kingdom of Sardinia) was planned to be annexed to France. Its capital was Cuneo.

The department was disbanded after the defeat of Napoleon in 1814. At the Congress of Vienna, the Savoyard King of Sardinia was restored in all its previous realms and domains, including Piedmont. Its territory corresponded more or less with that of the present-day Italian province of Cuneo.

Subdivisions
The department was subdivided into the following arrondissements and cantons (situation in 1812):

 Cuneo, cantons: Borgo San Dalmazzo, Boves, Busca, Caraglio, Centallo, Cuneo, Demonte, Dronero, San Damiano, Valgrana, Vernante and Vinadio.
 Alba, cantons: Alba, Bossolasco, Bra, Canale, Cortemilia, Guarene, La Morra and Sommariva del Bosco.
 Mondovì, cantons: Bene, Carrù, Chiusa, Mondovì (2 cantons), Rocca de' Baldi, Torre and Villanova.
 Saluzzo, cantons: Barge, Moretta, Paesana, Revello, Sampeyre, Saluzzo, Venasca and Verzuolo.
 Savigliano, cantons: Cavallermaggiore, Cherasco, Costigliole, Fossano, Racconigi and Savigliano.

Its population in 1812 was 431,438, and its area was approximately 857,216 hectares.

The Geographical Dictionary portable 1809 summarized the Department of Stura:

List of prefects 
26 August 1802 – 1803 Jean Laurent de Grégory, comte de Marcorengo
24 September 1803 – 1810 Pierre Amédée Vincent Joseph Marie Arborio-Biamino
30 November 1811 – 12 March 1813 Auguste Joseph Baude de La Vieuville 
12 March 1813 – March 1813 Antoine Louis Campan 		
25 March 1813 – 1814 Louis-Honoré-Félix Le Peletier d'Aunay

See also
The river Stura di Demonte, tributary of the Tanaro.
The rivers Stura di Lanzo and Stura del Monferrato, both tributaries of the Po.

References

Former departments of France in Italy
1801 establishments in France